Aria de Vries-Noordam is a Dutch Paralympic athlete. She represented the Netherlands at the 1972 Summer Paralympics held in Heidelberg, West Germany and she competed both in athletics and table tennis.

She won two medals in athletics: the gold medal in the women's shot put 1A event and the silver medal in the women's 60 metres wheelchair 1A event. She also won the gold medal in the women's singles 1A event in table tennis.

References

External links 
 

Living people
Year of birth missing (living people)
Place of birth missing (living people)
Dutch female table tennis players
Table tennis players at the 1972 Summer Paralympics
Paralympic table tennis players of the Netherlands
Medalists at the 1972 Summer Paralympics
Paralympic medalists in athletics (track and field)
Paralympic medalists in table tennis
Paralympic gold medalists for the Netherlands
Paralympic silver medalists for the Netherlands
Paralympic athletes of the Netherlands